Emiliana Arango (born 28 November 2000) is a Colombian tennis player. 

She has a career-high singles ranking of world No. 220, achieved on 7 March 2022. Up to date, she has won three singles titles on the ITF Circuit. Playing for Colombia Fed Cup team, Arango has a win–loss record of 7–8.

Junior career

Junior Grand Slam performance

Singles:
 Australian Open: –
 French Open: 2R (2017)
 Wimbledon: 1R (2016, 2017)
 US Open: SF (2017)

Doubles:
 Australian Open: –
 French Open: 2R (2017)
 Wimbledon: QF (2017)
 US Open: QF (2017)

On the ITF Junior Circuit, Arango has a career-high ranking of world No. 8, achieved in January 2018. In singles, she reached semifinals at the 2017 Junior US Open, however, she lost to Amanda Anisimova. In doubles, she reached two more quarterfinals, both in 2017, at Wimbledon and US Open, respectively. As a junior, she won three singles and three doubles titles.

Professional career
Arango made her WTA Tour singles debut at the 2016 Copa Colsanitas, where she lost in the first round to Irina Falconi, winning only one game.

At the 2018 Copa Colsanitas, she secured her first win at WTA Tour-level with a three-set victory over fourth seed Veronica Cepede Royg from Paraguay.

2022: Qualification for Grand Slam 
Arango enters to compete in the Grand Slam rankings for the first time in 2022, where he begins this path with the French Open  with a protection according to his WTA ranking with a protection against the Ukrainian player Lesia Tsurenko losing. Then he plays the qualification for the Wimbledon Championships in the first round, losing to the Chinese player Liang En-shuo.

2023: Semifinals Copa Oster-Cali WTA 125 tournaments 
Arango achieved her first semifinal in a WTA Tour 2023 Copa Oster, in the first round she beat Canadian Carol Zhao, the seventh seed of the tournament, in the second round she beat Renata Zarazúa from Mexico, in the third round she beat Italy and Martina Colmegna from the qualifier. , so that in this way she was installed in the first semifinal of her career in WTA 125 tournaments, against the Argentine Nadia Podoroska, where she beat Arango with 7-5, 6-1.

Performance timelines

Only main-draw results in WTA Tour, Grand Slam tournaments, Fed Cup/Billie Jean King Cup and Olympic Games are included in win–loss records.

Singles

ITF Circuit finals

Singles: 5 (3 titles, 2 runner–ups)

Doubles: 2 (2 runner–ups)

Notes

References

External links
 
 
 

2000 births
Living people
Colombian female tennis players
People from Port St. Lucie, Florida
Sportspeople from Medellín
Tennis players at the 2019 Pan American Games
21st-century Colombian women